The 1986–87 edition of the Belgian League was the 84th since its establishment: it was competed by 18 teams, and R.S.C. Anderlecht won the championship, while RFC Sérésien and K. Berchem Sport were relegated.

League standings

Results

Topscorers

References

Belgian Pro League seasons
Belgian
1